Science, Liberty and Peace is an essay written by Aldous Huxley, published in 1946. The essay debates a wide range of subjects reflecting Huxley's views towards the direction of society at that time. He puts forward a number of predictions, many of which resonate far beyond the time when it was written.
A consistent theme throughout the essay is Huxley's preference towards a decentralised society.

Quotes

Centralized media corporations 

“The man who pays the piper always calls the tune”

“Today, thanks to applied science, a dictator with the gift of the gab is able to pour his emotionally charged evangel into the ears of tens of millions”

“reading newspapers and listening to the radio are psychological addictions”

“I see the better and I approve; but the worst is what I pursue”

On the gradual removal of civil liberties 

“If offered the choice between liberty and security, most people would unhesitatingly vote for security”

Materialism 

“the dogma of inevitable progress became an unquestioned article of popular faith”

“the belief in all-round progress is based upon the wishful dream that one can get something for nothing”

History repeating itself 

“the most important lesson in history, it has been said, is that nobody ever learns history's lessons”

National pride 

“denies the value of a human being as a human being… affirms exclusiveness, encourages vanity, pride and self-satisfaction, stimulates hatred”

“As Athens and Sparta died of idolatry and flag-waving and jingoism"

Modern warfare 

"advances in technology" .. “do not abolish the institution of war; they merely modify its manifestations”

“whenever some crisis makes us forget our surface rationality and idealism”

“.. to build enough launching ramps and robot planes..”

“when things go badly at home…. It is always possible…. To shift people's attention away from domestic to foreign and military affairs”

“it becomes unpatriotic for anyone to voice even the most justifiable complaints against mismanagement or oppression”

“armaments are the only goods that are given away without consideration of loss or profits”

“we need not be surprised if the plans for an international inspectorate and the pooling of scientific knowledge should fail in practice to produce the good results expected of them.”

De-centralization 

“the Emersonian doctrine of Self-Reliance”

“mechanical techniques for the production of many consumer goods for a local market” 

“financial techniques … by which individuals can borrow money without increasing the power of the state or of commercial banks”

Banking 

“legal techniques, through which a community can protect itself against the profiteer who speculates in land values, which he has done nothing whatever to increase”

“in the eyes of medieval Catholic theologians .. the profession of a moneylender or a speculator was beyond the pale”

The rise of China 

“what will happen when India and China are as highly industrialized as pre-war Japan and seek to exchange their low-priced manufactured goods for food, in competition with Western powers, whose standard of living is a great deal higher than theirs?”

Exploiting Arctic resources 

“the Russian power system and the Anglo-American power system”

Helpful technologies 

“organized science could diminish these temptations to armed conflict by finding means for providing all countries, whatever their natural resources, with a sufficiency of power”

“the use of large-scale wind turbines is still, strangely enough, only in the experimental stage”

“One of the most urgent tasks before applied science is the development of some portable source of power to replace petroleum – a most undesirable fuel from a political point of view”

Science, technology, and freedom

References

External links
 

Essays by Aldous Huxley
1946 essays
English essays

sh:Vrata percepcije